St Bartholomew's Church, Butterton is a Grade II listed parish church in the Church of England in Butterton.

History

St Bartholomew's Church was redesigned by architect Ewan Christian and rebuilt in Butterton in 1871. It has a tower with two bells. The church is on the site of an earlier place of worship. The church's spire, which was added in 1879, dominates the local landscape and is one of the newest spires in the Peak District. Within the church there is a memorial plaque to Joseph Wood, Rowland Cantrill and William Hambleton, who all died trying to rescue Joseph Shenton from a disused mineshaft in 1842.

Organ

The church has an organ which originally was built by William Hill in 1846. A specification of the organ can be found on the National Pipe Organ Register, and its historic value has been recognised with the award of an Historic Organ Certificate by the British Institute of Organ Studies.

See also
Listed buildings in Butterton

References

Church of England church buildings in Staffordshire
Churches completed in 1873
Grade II listed churches in Staffordshire